In the history of Baghdad, the period from 1638 to 1704 began with the Fall of Baghdad after the Ottoman Empire occupied the city from the Safavid. It ended with the Hasan Pasha got power and also became the first Mamluk Governor of Baghdad on 1704. Kashik Hassan Pasha  was a first Ottoman Governor of Baghdad, and Youssef Pasha was the last

Timeline
 1652 – Population: 14000 .
 1657 – Flood.
 1663 – The Ottoman Poet Nazmizade Baghdadi dies. 
 1669 – A typhus spreads in Baghdad
 1672 – The Islamic scholar Mahmud Bin Ahmed al-Ahsá'í dies in Baghdad.
 1674 – Hussain Pasha mosque built 
 1681 – Al-adamiyah Dam was over after had seven years built
 1683
 Ibrahim Pasha had reconstructions Al-Sarai Mosque
 Khaseki mosque built 
 City besieged 
 1689
 An earthquake happens in Baghdad 
 The plague and Drought spreads in Baghdad 
 1690 – A plague was spreading in Baghdad the second time for less than one year
 1702 – An earthquake happened in Baghdad on 15 July 1702

Ottoman walis (1638–1704)

References

See also
 Mamluk dynasty of Iraq
 History of Baghdad 1831-1917

Ottoman Iraq
 1638
1638 establishments